Talian (also Romanized as Tālīān and Ţālīān) is a village in Baraghan Rural District, Chendar District, Savojbolagh County, Alborz Province, Iran. At the 2006 census, its population was 61, in 28 families.  It is situated 20 km west of Karaj, at the foot of Alborz mountains.

References 

Populated places in Savojbolagh County